Ilamai Kolam is a 1980 Indian Tamil-language film directed by N. Venkatesh. The film stars Suman, Raadhika and Pratap Pothen. It was released on 19 July 1980.

Plot

Cast 
Suman as Rajesh
Raadhika
Pratap Pothen
Nisha
K. R. Indira Devi

Soundtrack 
Music was composed by Ilaiyaraaja. Lyrics were by Kannadasan and Gangai Amaran. The song "Kannan Naalai" is set to the Carnatic raga Gourimanohari.

References

External links 
 

1980 films
1980s Tamil-language films
Films scored by Ilaiyaraaja